The Southern Elite Hockey League (SEHL) was an independent Jr. A ice hockey league based in Florida and Alabama.

League History
In the league's inaugural season, 1998–1999, the SEHL played with 6 teams all but two in Florida: the Alabama Gunners (Pelham, Alabama), the Chicago Force (Chicago, Illinois), the Daytona Riptide (Daytona Beach, Florida), the Jacksonville Hammerheads (Jacksonville, Florida), the Kissimmee Fury (Kissimmee, Florida), and the Space Coast Blast (Cape Canaveral, Florida).  The Gunners were clearly the toast of the league going on a 13-game unbeaten streak but folded after 24 games.  Because the Gunners were unable to finish the season, the door was left open for the Space Coast Blast to win the league championship.

The next season, 1999–2000, The Kissimmee Fury renamed themselves the Orlando Fury and the SEHL added the Pelham Prowlers (Pelham, Alabama) and the Tampa Bay Ice Pirates (Tampa, Florida).  Again, the sole Alabama team dominated the season.  The Prowlers went an outstanding 34-5-1 during the regular season and swept the Orlando Fury in two games and the Space Coast Blast in three games to take the SEHL championship from the previous champion.

The league suspended operations during the 2000-2001 season and had every intention of returning with at least 9 teams in 2001-2002, but those plans never materialized and the league folded.

Champions

Alumni in the Pros

Alabama Gunners

Chicago Force
 Sean Flynn (UHL)
 Anthony Di Iulio USHL

Daytona Riptide
 Makoonse "Koona" Briggs (UHL)

Jacksonville Hammerheads
 Kevin Carr (CHL, South East HL, ECHL)
 Sean Honeysett (UHL)

Kissimmee/Orlando Fury
 Chris Affinati (CHL, UHL, WHA2, SPHL)
 Jessy Berube (ACHL, WHA2,   LNAH)
 Chris Morseth (CHL, WCHL, UHL)
 Rob Sanders (NCAA Hockey East

Pelham Prowlers
 Darrell Baumken (SPHL)
 Jim Black (ECHL, WHA2)
 Noel Burkitt (EPIHL, BNL, EIHL)
 Tanner Harpwood (WPHL, ECHL, NEHL)
 Steve Howard (CHL, ACHL, WHA2, South East HL, SPHL, ECHL)
 Daniel Kletke (UHL, ECHL, WPHL, South East HL)

Space Coast Blast

 Janne Ahmavuo (UHL)
 CJ Carlson(ECHL)
 Rocky Florio (WPHL, CHL, UHL)
 Eddie Garrison (MLRH, RHI, CHL, NFHL)
 Jamie Sargent (ECHL, IHL, DEL, SPHL)
 Scott Ross   WPHL, CHL
 Joey Spencer (UHL, ECHL, CIS, SPHL, Danish Elite League)
 Shane Magnus (Captain) (CHL, SJHL)

Notes

Defunct ice hockey leagues in the United States
Ice hockey in Alabama
Ice hockey in Florida
1998–99 in American ice hockey by league
1999–2000 in American ice hockey by league